Global Ties U.S. is a non-partisan, 501(c)(3) non-profit organization established in 1961 to promote excellence in citizen diplomacy.  It is based in Washington, DC, in the United States.

Global Ties U.S. members include international organizations, national program agencies, and more than 100 community-based organizations throughout the United States.  Members design and implement professional programs, provide cultural activities, and offer home hospitality opportunities for foreign leaders, specialists, and international scholars participating in the U.S. Department of State's International Visitor Leadership Program and other exchange programs.  More than one-third of the community members are staffed by volunteers.

History

Founding

After World War II the International Visitor Program (IVP) brought in an annually increasing number of foreign visitors to the United States.  As it became difficult for the United States Department of State to facilitate the research and logistics of the program, they turned to private sector organizations such as the Institute of International Education (IIE) and the  Governmental Affairs Institute (GAI).  These national program agencies (NPAs), funded by the Department of State, would work in collaboration with more voluntary, locally established centers for international visitors (CIVs) to map out an itinerary for incoming international visitors.

A number of issues became evident as these private organizations functioned together.  The NPAs and CIVs had been working in poor communication and coordination—both among and within themselves—resulting in a stifled exchange of skills and information and therefore programming capacity; and it was not clear as to how those organizations should be funded.

Representatives from relevant organizations held many discussions to address these financial and communicative issues.  On February 11, 1957, the Interim Council for Community Services to International Visitors (ICCSIV) was established to help sustain the growth of the IVP and its local organizations.  The ICCSIV, whose membership reflected both private and public organizations, served as a sort of Board of Directors to coordinate the efforts between NPAs and CIVs.

Members of the ICCSIV agreed to establish the National Council for Community Services to International Visitors (NCCSIV) on November 30, 1960, a first step toward creating an official organization.  NCCSIV adopted the acronym COSERV in April 1961, and officially incorporated as a non-profit organization in 1965.  COSERV changed its name to the National Council for International Visitors (NCIV) on October 1, 1979, to reflect its central role as a coordinator for CIVs and other programming agencies for the International Visitor Leadership Program (IVLP). The organization changed its name to Global Ties U.S. in 2014.

Nobel Peace Prize nomination
Senator Arlen Specter (R-PA) nominated Global Ties U.S. (then NCIV) and its volunteers for the Nobel Peace Prize in 2001.

Members
Global Ties U.S. has over 100 community-based member organizations throughout the United States.  The role of these organizations is to organize programs for participants in the IVLP.

Citizen Diplomat Award
Global Ties U.S. distributes numerous awards in recognition of excellent citizen diplomacy, the most well-known of which is its Citizen Diplomat Award. Global Ties U.S. presents the Citizen Diplomat Award to an individual or institution "for outstanding achievements in furthering the cause of international understanding and global engagement".

References

External links
Global Ties U.S. - official website
International Visitor Leadership Program
Encyclopedia of Arkansas History & Culture entry

Foreign relations of the United States
Non-profit organizations based in Washington, D.C.